Maren Larae Morris (born April 10, 1990) is an American singer-songwriter. While rooted in the country genre, her music also blends elements of pop, R&B, and hip-hop. Born and raised in Arlington, Texas, Morris enjoyed singing as a child. She started publicly performing in her preteen years and toured throughout Texas. In her late teens and early twenties, she released three studio albums on independent record labels. She relocated to Nashville, Tennessee, to pursue a career in country music during this same time period. Morris signed a publishing contract and later a recording contract following the streaming success of her 2015 self-titled EP.

Morris's fourth studio album Hero (2016) was released on Columbia Nashville and blended country with R&B styles. Its lead single "My Church" became her breakout single at country radio and was followed by the commercially successful songs "80s Mercedes", "I Could Use a Love Song" and "Rich." In 2018, Morris collaborated with Grey and Zedd on the song "The Middle". Released as a single, the track became a top ten pop success in various countries. She followed it in 2019 with her fifth album titled Girl. The album mixed country with various music styles and featured collaborations with different artists. It spawned the number one singles "Girl" and "The Bones". Morris released her sixth studio album on March 25, 2022, titled Humble Quest. In addition to her solo work, she has recorded as a member of The Highwomen and in collaboration with her husband, Ryan Hurd.

Morris has had two albums certified for sales certifications in North America. She has scored three number one songs on the Billboard Country Airplay chart and eight top ten songs on the Billboard Hot Country Songs chart. Morris has won multiple accolades including one Grammy award, five Academy of Country Music Awards, one American Music award and five Country Music Association Awards.

Childhood and teenage years
Morris was born in Arlington, Texas to Greg and Kellie Morris. Her parents owned the Maren Karsen Aveda Hair Salon, which is still in operation today in Arlington. Morris spent much of her childhood at the salon. She later worked there as a front desk clerk and guest coordinator. In her elementary years, she participated in the school choir, performed theater and played soccer. Morris discovered she could sing one day at a party at her parents' salon. At the event, she performed karaoke versions of songs by Patsy Cline and LeAnn Rimes. Impressed by her natural singing ability, Greg Morris started encouraging his daughter to perform regularly.

Among her first performances was at Johnnie High's, a country music revue similar in style to the Grand Ole Opry. From that moment, Morris realized that "this [singing] is my calling". At age 12, her father bought her a guitar which inspired her to start writing songs. At the same time, Morris continued going through public school. She attended James Bowie High School in Arlington where she continued playing soccer. Her favorite classes were creative writing and art.

Career

2002–2015: Career beginnings in Texas, move to Nashville and songwriting
Morris started touring her home state of Texas when she was 11 years old. Her father acted as her manager and booking agent. Morris often played the cities of Dallas and Fort Worth, where she played bars and clubs. "Music was always this weekend job that I had while the rest of my friends were going to slumber parties," she recounted.

In 2005, she took her first plane trip alone to attend a Grammy camp. Morris was one of several high school students from across the country selected to attend the camp sponsored by the Grammy Foundation. She got to meet music industry insiders at music workshops. In 2005, Morris released her debut studio album when she was 15 years old titled Walk On. The disc was released on the independent Mozzi Bozzi label and contained ten tracks of mostly self written material. The record was financed by her parents who "literally sold the furniture out of the house" to pay for its recording and release, according to her mother Kellie Morris.  Smith Music released Morris's second studio album in 2007, titled All That It Takes. The project was similar to her first record because it contained mostly self-composed tracks.

In her late teens, Morris auditioned for a series of television music competition programs including American Idol, America's Got Talent, The Voice, and Nashville Star. She was rejected after auditioning for all of the television shows. Years later, Morris's songs would be used by contestants performing in the show. Morris also joined a teen band in her teenage years called They Were Stars, which she played keyboards and provided harmony vocals. After graduating high school, Morris briefly enrolled at the University of North Texas but left after one semester. In 2011, the Mozzi Bozzi label released her third studio disc titled Live Wire.

During this time, she paid a visit to a friend Kacey Musgraves, whom she had first met on the Texas music scene. Musgraves, who was living in Nashville, Tennessee, encouraged Morris to also make the move. After saving enough money, Morris packed a U-Haul trailer and moved to Nashville. Morris spent her first year in Nashville networking and meeting other writers. She was later introduced to Carla Wallace of Big Yellow Dog Music. Impressed by her songwriting, Wallace signed her to a four-year songwriting contract with company. She began co-writing material with other songwriters. Her material was soon recorded by several country artists. This began with Tim McGraw, who recorded "Last Turn Home" for his 2014 album Sundown Heaven Town. Another track, "Second Wind" was recorded by Kelly Clarkson for her 2015 album Piece by Piece.

Some of her material was more personal and Morris was encouraged by Wallace to start recording music herself. Among her personal compositions was the track "My Church", which she wrote in March 2015. After listening to the demo recording, Morris realized she wanted to shelve the song for herself. It was also around this time that she met record producer Busbee. He was impressed by Morris's writing and vocal delivery, later commenting, "She was singing her own music, and it was world class. I was super freaked out — in a good way."

2016–2017: Breakthrough with Hero
Morris initially self-released five songs on eponymous extended play, Maren Morris. It was released on Spotify in August 2015. The songs gained 2.5 million streams on Spotify in a month, with three songs appearing on Spotify's US and Global "Viral 50" chart. The success of Morris' EP attracted the interest of major labels, and she was signed to Columbia Nashville in September 2015. The label re-released the five-song EP in November 2015. "My Church" was issued as the project's the lead single. The EP charted at number 22 on the Billboard Country Albums chart and number one on the Top Heatseekers chart.

In 2016, "My Church" became Morris's first major hit single. It peaked at number five on the Billboard country songs chart, number nine on the same publication's Country Airplay chart. and number three on the Canada Country chart. Morris later won Best Country Solo Performance for the song at the 60th Annual Grammy Awards. Her first Columbia Nashville album was released in June 2016 titled Hero. It reached number five on the Billboard 200, and number one on the country albums chart. Joe Caramanica of The New York Times called Hero "both utterly of its moment and also savvy enough to indicate how the future might sound." Three more singles were spawned from Hero: "80's Mercedes", "I Could Use a Love Song" and "Rich". With the exception of "80's Mercedes", the singles reached the top ten of the Billboard country charts between 2016 and 2018.

With newfound commercial success, Morris embarked on a tour with Keith Urban in 2016. This was followed by 2017's headlining "Hero" tour to support her album. A deluxe edition of Hero was released in March 2017, featuring three new recordings. She also provided vocals to Thomas Rhett's "Craving You" in 2017. Morris was also featured on Niall Horan's pop song "Seeing Blind" in 2017 and later opened for Horan on his Flicker World Tour. In response to the 2017 Las Vegas shooting, Morris released "Dear Hate", a song she had written and recorded with Vince Gill, with all proceeds from the track going to the Music City Cares Fund. Morris continued earning awards for her success including the "Best New Artist" accolade from the Country Music Association and several more Grammy nominations.

2018–present: Pop crossover, new collaborations and continued country success

In 2018, Morris was chosen by Zedd and Grey to appear as the lead vocalist on their pop single "The Middle". Zedd traveled to Nashville to record Morris's part and the song was released following that. The track became her breakout pop crossover single and expanded her audience. "The Middle" reached the Billboard Hot 100 top ten, peaking at number five. Taylor Weatherby of Billboard commented that the song "may have drawn the roadmap for a reliable new path to crossover success." On October 5, 2018, Morris appeared as a special guest during Taylor Swift's Reputation Stadium Tour in Arlington, Texas, performing "The Middle" with Swift.

Morris's next studio album Girl was released in March 2019. According to Morris, the project reflected her own experiences as a young woman while also highlighting the experiences of other women her age. Rolling Stone rated the album three and a half stars, calling it the project "where Morris makes her pop move." The disc topped the Billboard country albums chart and the reached the top five of the Billboard 200. She later embarked on Girl: The World Tour, to support the album. Its lead single of the same name reached the number one spot on the Billboard country airplay chart and number eight on the Billboard country songs chart. It was followed by the second single "The Bones", which topped both the Country Airplay and Country Songs charts in 2020. A duet version with Hozier became her second crossover pop hit, peaking at number 12 on the Hot 100 and number one on the adult contemporary chart. Girl would win Album of the Year at the 2019 Country Music Association Awards, while Morris herself later won Female Vocalist of the Year from the association, and later two wins for Female Artist of the Year at the Academy of Country Music Awards (2020 and 2021).

In March 2019, it was announced that Morris would be forming a group with Brandi Carlile, Amanda Shires and Natalie Hemby called The Highwomen (in reference to The Highwaymen). A social media post by Shires' husband Jason Isbell hinted that the group had already begun recording with producer Dave Cobb. The Highwomen made their live debut in April 2019 at Loretta Lynn's 87th birthday concert performing "It Wasn't God Who Made Honky Tonk Angels". "Redesigning Women" was released on July 19, 2019, as the first single from the group's self-titled debut album. Their self-titled debut album was released in September 2019. The album had a top-ten debut on Billboard 200 and number one on the Country Chart. Busbee died in September 2019. "This just doesn’t seem fair. I will always love you and the songs and albums I was lucky to make with you, Busbee," she later wrote on Twitter.

In 2021, Morris collaborated with husband Ryan Hurd on the single "Chasing After You", which reached the top five on the Billboard country charts. She was the featured guest vocalist on John Mayer's single "Last Train Home", released on June 4, 2021. In January 2022, Morris' next single was released titled "Circles Around This Town". It was followed by the release of her next studio album Humble Quest in March 2022. For this album, Greg Kurstin served as producer. GQ magazine described its sound as a "return from glittery pop to her stripped-down country origins." Humble Quest debuted at number two on the Billboard country albums chart and number 21 on the Billboard 200. Pitchfork gave it an 8.0 rating, calling it "matter-of-factly masterful". Rolling Stone gave it 3.5 stars, calling it "fascinating, and proudly unresolved."

Artistry
The musical style of Maren Morris blends country music with country pop, R&B and hip-hop. Writers and critics commented that Morris's first two Columbia albums combined country with R&B and Hip-Hop musical styles. Stephen Thomas Erlewine of AllMusic found that 2016's Hero included "R&B influences" that "twists the rhymes" and "[rides] the beat" while "undercutting her boasts with sly wit." Jewly Hight of Billboard described Hero as "a ­signifier of country-pop’s fluidity and a creative process that resembles the track-building of pop, R&B and hip-hop." The Hartford Courant praised 2019's Girl for incorporating similar styles: "If a lot of male country singers dabble with hip-hop in ways that sometimes feel stilted, Morris brings straight-up elements of ‘90s R&B to the album on songs like the bedroom-centric 'RSVP'."

Morris's vocal style been noticed by writers and critics. When reviewing her 2019 album, Jon Caramanica described her voice as "versatile" in the way it can move between both the country and pop genres. Chris Richards of The Washington Post described Morris as having "the best voice of any country singer working today". Richards further explained, "Listen to her jump in and out of her lyrics and you’ll hear a sophistication that feels like something metaphysical."

Overall, Morris characterizes herself as a country artist. In an interview with NPR, Morris was asked about whether she still identified with the genre: "even though I live in Nashville and I'm from Texas and I feel like my songwriting at its core is country, I think you can hear a lot of different influences when you've heard any of my records." Other writers have agreed, including Stephen Thomas Erlewine: "Morris' music was grounded in country -- prior to striking gold as a performer, she was a professional songwriter in Nashville -- but she also incorporated elements of pop, R&B, hip-hop, and rock, creating a distinctive, stylish hybrid that had wide appeal outside her chosen genre."

Morris has cited various artists of different genres as influences on her career. Among these artists are Katy Perry, Coldplay, Linda Ronstadt, Dolly Parton, Chaka Khan, and Hank Williams.

Advocacy
In 2017, Morris started the Heroes Fund which raises money for music education in public schools. Through the program, Morris donated $70,000 to East Nashville Magnet High School that went towards their music and drama departments. In April 2021, Morris donated $300,000 to the NAACP Legal Defense and Educational Fund, Together We Rise and Ecologi. In August 2021, Morris joined several country artists to raise money for the program Together: Feeding Nashville. The concert raised money to fund "food insecurity" in the Nashville area. A total of $450,000 was raised from the show.

Morris has been an advocate for making the country genre more equitable for fellow artists. She has commented on the inequalities particularly for white and black artists in the genre. "I'm a white woman in country music. I already have this sort of leg-up. There's a huge disparity between men and women in our genre, there's even more of a disparity between white women and black women trying to be in country music," she told The Ellen DeGeneres Show in 2021. In her 2020 CMA Awards acceptance speech, Morris named several black artists who helped make the award possible including Mickey Guyton, Linda Martell and Brittney Spencer. In early 2021, Morris spoke out against country artist Morgan Wallen when a video of him using a racial slur surfaced. "You can’t control a human being, but you absolutely can let them know where you stand," she told Variety.

In August 2022, Morris replied to an Instagram post made by Jason Aldean's wife, Brittany. Both Morris and other country music singers including Cassadee Pope perceived Aldean's comments as transphobic. While interviewing Brittany Aldean, Fox News Channel host Tucker Carlson referred to Morris as a "lunatic country music person." In response to this comment, Morris sold T-shirts through her website featuring the phrase "lunatic country music person" and the telephone number of the Trans Lifeline. She also stated that proceeds from the shirts would be donated to GLAAD. In September 2022, Morris partnered with GLAAD to design a new T-shirt in honor of Spirit Day.

Personal life

Morris met fellow country singer-songwriter Ryan Hurd while co-writing "Last Turn Home" for Tim McGraw. Their relationship began as friends. In December 2015, the pair began dating and announced their engagement in July 2017. The two were married on March 24, 2018, in Nashville, Tennessee. The couple then moved into a three-bedroom, three-bathroom home in Nashville, Tennessee with a wrap-around porch. Their first child, a son, was born on March 23, 2020.

Morris told Taste of Country that she suffered a difficult labor which eventually resulted in a C-section delivery. This led to a challenging post-pregnancy for Morris. She recalled suffering from postpartum depression for nearly a year after giving birth. "I just wish I had done a better job at preparing myself for the shock of a C-section, because the postpartum of a C-section is so brutal", she commented.

Discography

 Walk On (2005)
 All That It Takes (2007)
 Live Wire (2011)
 Hero (2016)
 Girl (2019)
 Humble Quest (2022)

Filmography

Awards and nominations

Maren Morris has won a series of awards for her work as a music artist. This includes five accolades from the Academy of Country Music, five from the Country Music Association and one from the Grammy Awards.

Tours
Headlining
The Hero Tour (2017)
GIRL: The World Tour (2019)
Humble Quest Tour (2022)

Supporting
Ripcord World Tour (2016) 
15 in a 30 Tour (2017) 
Flicker World Tour (2018) 
Roadside Bars & Pink Guitars Tour (2019) 
The Chicks World Tour 2023 (2023)

References

External links
 

 
1990 births
Living people
21st-century American singers
21st-century American women singers
American country singer-songwriters
American women country singers
APRA Award winners
Columbia Records artists
Country musicians from Tennessee
Country musicians from Texas
Country pop musicians
Grammy Award winners
Musicians from Dallas
People from Arlington, Texas
Singers from Nashville, Tennessee
Singer-songwriters from Texas
The Highwomen members
University of North Texas alumni
Singer-songwriters from Tennessee
Transgender rights activists